It Pays to Advertise is a 1919 American silent drama film directed by Donald Crisp and written by Elmer Blaney Harris based upon a play of the same name by Roi Cooper Megrue and Walter C. Hackett. The film stars Bryant Washburn, Lois Wilson, Frank Currier, Walter Hiers, Clarence Geldart, and Julia Faye. The film was released on November 23, 1919, by Paramount Pictures. It is not known whether the film currently survives, and it may be a lost film.

The film was remade in 1931.

Plot
As described in a film magazine, Rodney Martin (Washburn) graduates from college with a splendid education and is surprised to find himself absolutely unprepared for a business career. However, business strangely attracts him, possible because of Mary Grayson (Wilson), his father's secretary, whom he thinks is the most proper thing in women. Since she is a businesswoman, he reasons that he must prove himself a business man. He decks out an office before he decides what line of business he will follow. A friend suggests the soap business. He straight away begins an advertising campaign that works wonders. However, the bills, when they arrive, overcome him and he faces disaster. His father comes to the rescue by appointing him as an advertising man in his organization, so all ends as it should.

Cast
Bryant Washburn as Rodney Martin
Lois Wilson as Mary Grayson
Frank Currier as Cyrus Martin
Walter Hiers as Ambrose Peale
Clarence Geldart as House Manager
Julia Faye as Countess de Beaurien
Guy Oliver as McChesney

References

External links 

 
 
 Film stills at www.silentfilmstillarchive.com

1919 films
1910s English-language films
Silent American drama films
1919 drama films
Paramount Pictures films
Films directed by Donald Crisp
American black-and-white films
American silent feature films
American films based on plays
1910s American films